Monterey Jack, sometimes shortened to Jack, is a US white, semi-hard cheese made using cow's milk, with a mild flavor and slight sweetness. It has been called "an American original" and "as a vestige of Spanish rule in the early nineteenth century, derives from a Franciscan monastic style of farmer's cheese."

In addition to being eaten by itself, it is frequently marbled with Colby to produce Colby-Jack, or with yellow cheddar to produce cheddar-Jack. Pepper Jack is a version flavored with chili peppers and herbs. Dry Jack is a harder cheese with a longer aging time.

Origins 

In its earliest form, Monterey Jack was made by 18th-century Franciscan friars of Monterey, Alta California. California businessman David Jacks sold the cheese commercially. He produced a mild white cheese that came to be known eponymously as "Jacks' Cheese" and eventually "Monterey Jack". Other ranchers in the area likewise produced the cheese, among them Andrew Molera, who built a successful dairy operation in Big Sur and whose Monterey Jack was especially well regarded.

Aging
Although most of the softer varieties found in American supermarkets are aged for only one month, "dry Jack" is a harder variety aged for up to six months.

Uses 
The cheese is commonly used as an interior melting cheese for quesadillas, California-style burritos, and also some Mexican-style burritos ("bean and cheese"). It can also be used on cheeseburgers or for grilled cheese sandwiches. It has a mild flavor and good melting quality for some pasta dishes.

Variants

Dry Jack 
Dry Jack was created by accident in 1915, when a San Francisco wholesaler forgot about a number of wheels of fresh Jack he had stored. As World War I intensified and shipments of hard cheese from Europe were interrupted, he rediscovered the wheels, which had aged into a product his customers found to be a good substitute for classic hard cheeses like Parmesan.

Pepper Jack 

Pepper Jack is a derivative of Monterey Jack flavored with spicy chili peppers, bell peppers, and herbs.

Blends 
Additional flavor and visual appeal is created by marbling with Colby (making Colby-Jack) or a yellow cheddar cheese.

Headaches safety
Because of its low content of tyramine, an organic compound thought to be associated with headaches, Monterey Jack is frequently recommended as one of the few cheeses that is safe to eat for migraine sufferers.

See also

Mallorca cheese
Mahón cheese
 List of cheeses

References

External links

Bibliography of Dairying in California 1770 to 1945
Archival Materials - Dairying In California 1770 to 1945

American cheeses
Cow's-milk cheeses
Tex-Mex cuisine
Agriculture in California